David Edward Foley (February 3, 1930 – April 17, 2018) was an American prelate of the Roman Catholic Church who served as the third bishop of the Diocese of Birmingham in Alabama from 1994 to 2005.  He previously served as an auxiliary bishop of the Diocese of Richmond in Virginia from 1986 to 1994,

Biography

Early life 
David Foley was born in Worcester, Massachusetts on February 3, 1930.  He was ordained a priest for the Archdiocese of Washington on May 26, 1956. 

Foley was appointed by Pope John Paul II as an auxiliary bishop of the Diocese of Richmond on May 3, 1986. Foley was consecrated on June 27, 1986, by Bishop Walter Sullivan.

Bishop of Birmingham 
John Paul II appointed Foley as the third bishop of the Diocese of Birmingham on March 22, 1994. He was installed on May 13, 1994. 

In 1999, Foley issued a decree prohibiting priests in his diocese, under most circumstances, from celebrating Mass in the ad orientem position. Though the decree never specifically mentioned the Catholic television network EWTN, which has its studios located in the diocese, observers agreed that it was directed at Mother Angelica's network.

On May 10, 2005, Pope Benedict VI accepted Foley's resignation as bishop of Birmingham.  He was elected diocesan administrator on May 19, 2005.

David Foley died on April 17, 2018, in Birmingham at age 86.

See also

 Catholic Church hierarchy
 Catholic Church in the United States
 Historical list of the Catholic bishops of the United States
 List of Catholic bishops of the United States
 Lists of patriarchs, archbishops, and bishops

References

External links
 Roman Catholic Diocese of Birmingham official website

1930 births
2018 deaths
20th-century Roman Catholic bishops in the United States
21st-century Roman Catholic bishops in the United States
Roman Catholic Diocese of Birmingham in Alabama
Roman Catholic Diocese of Richmond
Roman Catholic bishops in Alabama
Religious leaders from Virginia